Zeccone is a comune (municipality) in the Province of Pavia in the Italian region Lombardy, located about 20 km south of Milan and about 10 km northeast of Pavia.

Zeccone borders the following municipalities: Bornasco, Giussago, San Genesio ed Uniti.

References

Cities and towns in Lombardy